Anthony Joseph DiStefano Jr. (born February 6, 1957) is an American former professional motocross racer. He competed in the AMA Motocross Championships from 1973 to 1981. A three-time AMA 250cc motocross national champion, DiStefano was inducted into the AMA Motorcycle Hall of Fame in 1999.

Motocross career
Born in Bristol, Pennsylvania, DiStefano was the son of a motorcycle shop owner and began riding motorcycles at an early age. He began his professional racing career in 1973 on a privateer CZ. During the 1974 season, he led the 500cc motocross national championship for most of the year before an injury relegated him to second place behind Jimmy Weinert. At the end of the 1974 season, DiStefano along with Weinert, Brad Lackey and Jim Pomeroy were selected by the AMA to represent the United States at the Motocross des Nations event where they finished in an impressive second-place. Their performance marked the best-ever result at the time for an American team at the event, at a time when American motocross racers were still seen as less experienced than their European rivals.

DiStefano's strong performance earned him a job with the Suzuki factory motocross team. With Suzuki's support, he proceeded to win three AMA 250cc national championships in a row in 1975, 1976 and 1977. DiStefano also swept all three races of the 1975 Inter-AMA championship to become the second American rider after Jim Pomeroy to win an internationally sanctioned event. DiStefano along with Steve Stackable, Kent Howerton and Gary Semics, represented the United States at the 1977 Motocross des Nations and Trophy des Nations events where they scored impressive second-place finishes in France and Holland.

At the end of 1979, DiStefano seriously injured his eye in a home construction accident. Despite being nearly blind in one eye, he made a valiant come back. Afterwards, injuries began to take their toll and DiStefano retired from competition after the 1981 season. He continued his involvement in the sport by starting a motocross school for young riders in 1982. In 1988, while practicing at a track in New Jersey, DiStefano crashed, broke his back and became paralyzed.

Today DiStefano continues to teach his motocross schools traveling around the United States. He was inducted into the AMA Motorcycle Hall of Fame in 1999.

References

External links
 Tony DiStefano motocross school
 American Motorcyclist, January 1976, Vol. 30, No. 1, ISSN 0277-9358

1957 births
Living people
People from Bristol, Pennsylvania
People from Morrisville, Pennsylvania
American people of Italian descent
American disabled sportspeople
American motocross riders
AMA Motocross Championship National Champions
People with paraplegia